"Sleep Like Breathing" is a song by British singer-songwriter Alison Moyet with David Freeman, which was released in 1987 as the fourth and final single from her second studio album Raindancing. The song was written by Freeman and Joseph Hughes, both of whom made up The Lover Speaks, and was produced by Jimmy Iovine, Freeman and Hughes.

During recording sessions of Raindancing, The Lover Speaks contributed three songs to the project, although only "Sleep Like Breathing" was included on the album. Upon release, "Sleep Like Breathing" peaked at No. 80 and remained in the Top 100 for three weeks. A promotional video was filmed to promote the single, which also featured Freeman.

Release
The single was released by CBS on 7" and 12" vinyl in the UK and Europe. The B-Side "Love Resurrection (Live)" was exclusive to the single. On the European 12" vinyl release, two additional live songs were included: "Ne Me Quitte Pas" and "Don't Burn Down the Bridge". In the UK, the 12" single featured only "Ne Me Quitte Pas" alongside "Love Resurrection" as the B-Sides. A limited edition 12" version was also issued in the UK, replacing "Ne Me Quitte Pas" with "Don't Burn Down the Bridge". The three live tracks were recorded at Wembley Arena on 13 May 1987.

Critical reception
On its release as a single, Music & Media described the song as a "hypnotic and atmospheric ballad". In a review of Raindancing, Betty Page of Record Mirror picked "Sleep Like Breathing" as the album's highlight. She described the song as "a lullaby which aches with a languid heaviness and sways with veiled suggestion and delicate sensuousness". Page also praised the song in comparison to some of the album's other tracks for being one which Moyet "rises to, rather than drops to the level of". Praising Moyet's "interpretive gifts" and Iovine's "understated production" on Raindancing, American magazine Musician described the song as one which has "such lasting allure". Jonathan Butler of People described it as being one of only two songs on Raindancing to "exhibit the haunting quality she [Moyet] is capable of" and "reminiscent of more cerebral, Kate Bush-like material."

J. D. Considine of The Baltimore Sun felt the song "allows Moyet to exploit her dramatic range to its fullest". Steve Hochman of Los Angeles Times wrote, "Moyet's voice needs - deserves - arrangements that either match its big, glorious and soaring quality, or offset it with spacious, atmospheric backing. While her second solo effort contains three gorgeous examples of the latter (including "Sleep Like Breathing"), it has none of the former." Digital Audio and Compact Disc Review commented that "there's just no hope for such dull, lethargic ballads as "Blow Wind Blow" and "Sleep Like Breathing"." The Trouser Press Record Guide singled-out the song as the album's "low point", describing it as "stiflingly schmaltzy".

In a retrospective review of Raindancing, Paul Scott-Bates of the music website Louder Than War commented that the song's single release was "almost criminally ignored". Loz Etheridge of God is in the TV considered it a "tragically overlooked duet" and a "standout" on Raindancing. Adrian Janes of Penny Black Music said the song "plumbs the emotional depths".

Formats
7" single
"Sleep Like Breathing" - 4:20
"Love Resurrection (Live)" - 6:22

12" single (European release)
"Sleep Like Breathing" - 4:20
"Love Resurrection (Live)" - 6:22
"Ne Me Quitte Pas (Live)" - 5:12
"Don't Burn Down The Bridge (Live)" - 5:00

12" single (UK release)
"Sleep Like Breathing" - 4:20
"Love Resurrection (Live)" - 6:22
"Ne Me Quitte Pas (Live)" - 5:12

12" single (UK limited edition release)
"Sleep Like Breathing" - 4:20
"Love Resurrection (Live)" - 6:22
"Don't Burn Down The Bridge (Live)" - 5:00

Chart performance

Personnel
 Alison Moyet - vocals
 David Freeman - vocals, producer
 Mike Shipley - associate producer on "Sleep Like Breathing"
 Jimmy Iovine, Joseph Hughes - producer on "Sleep Like Breathing"
 Philippe Bertrand - recording, mixing (live tracks)

References

1987 songs
1987 singles
Alison Moyet songs
Pop ballads
Male–female vocal duets
CBS Records singles
Song recordings produced by Jimmy Iovine